Sant'Anna di Palazzo (or church of the Rosario di Palazzo) is a church in the quartiere of San Ferdinando in Naples, Italy.

After the victory at the Lepanto, this church and Santa Maria della Vittoria in Naples were erected and dedicated to the Madonna del Rosario, whose devotion was felt to have contributed to the success at the battle. In 1572, Michele Lauro offered the Dominicans this land for construction of a church. In this time, this zone was exterior to the walls and less populated.

One of the leaders of the Parthenopean Republic, Eleonora Fonseca Pimentel was married here in February 1778, and later buried her son here. Luca Giordano was baptized in this church.

The facade (1706-1710) is attributed to Giovanni Battista Nauclerio. The stucco decorations date from the 17th century, but heavily restored in the 18th century. There are four bas-relief depictions of popes who helped establish the devotion of the rosary: Popes Benedict XI, Benedict XIII, Innocent V, and Pius V. The main altar (1729) created by Domenico Antonio Vaccaro. The main altarpiece is a Madonna del Rosario (c. 1738) by Giuseppe Bonito. The Rococo style sacristy (1739) was completed by Michelangelo Porzio. The dome, once tiled with Maiolica, dominates the skyline of the zone.

The church was severely damaged during bombardments in 1943.

References

Bibliography
 Vincenzo Regina, Le chiese di Napoli. Viaggio indimenticabile attraverso la storia artistica, architettonica, letteraria, civile e spirituale della Napoli sacra, Newton and Compton editor, Naples 2004.

External links

Roman Catholic churches in Naples
18th-century Roman Catholic church buildings in Italy
Baroque architecture in Naples
Quartieri Spagnoli